Kyle Edmund and Frederico Ferreira Silva are the defending champions having won the 2012 event. This year Edmund decided not to participate, while Frederico Ferreira Silva partners up with Quentin Halys, but lost to Kamil Majchrzak and Martin Redlicki in the final.

Seeds

Draw

Finals

Top half

Bottom half

External links 
 Draw

Boys' Doubles
US Open, 2013 Boys' Doubles